George Gardiner VC DCM (1821 – 17 November 1891) was born in Clonallon, Warrenpoint, County Down and was an Irish recipient of the Victoria Cross, the highest and most prestigious award for gallantry in the face of the enemy that can be awarded to British and Commonwealth forces.

Details
He was about 34 years old, and a sergeant in the 57th Regiment of Foot (later The Middlesex Regiment (Duke of Cambridge's Own)), British Army during the Crimean War when the following deed took place for which he was awarded the VC.

On 22 March 1855 at Sebastopol, Crimea, Sergeant Gardiner acted with great gallantry upon the occasion of a sortie by the enemy, in having rallied the covering parties which had been driven in by the Russians, thus regaining the trenches. On 18 June during the attack on the Redan he himself remained and encouraged others to remain in the holes made by the explosions of the shells, and whence they were able to keep up a continuous fire until their ammunition was exhausted, and the enemy cleared away from the parapet.

He later achieved the rank of Colour-Sergeant. He died at Lifford, County Donegal, 17 November 1891. He is buried at Clonleigh Church of Ireland Churchyard, Lifford.

His Victoria Cross is displayed at the Princess of Wales's Royal Regiment (Queen's and Royal Hampshires) (Dover Castle, England).

References

The Register of the Victoria Cross (1981, 1988 and 1997)

Ireland's VCs  (Dept of Economic Development, 1995)
Monuments to Courage (David Harvey, 1999)
Irish Winners of the Victoria Cross (Richard Doherty & David Truesdale, 2000)

External links
Location of grave and VC medal (Co. Donegal, Ireland)
The Middlesex Regiment 1755-1966 (detailed history of the original "Die Hards")

1821 births
1891 deaths
Military personnel from County Down
People from Warrenpoint
Crimean War recipients of the Victoria Cross
British Army personnel of the Crimean War
Recipients of the Distinguished Conduct Medal
Middlesex Regiment soldiers
Irish soldiers in the British Army
Irish recipients of the Victoria Cross
British military personnel of the New Zealand Wars
British Army recipients of the Victoria Cross